Zdravko Počivalšek (born 25 November 1957) is a Slovenian politician. He served as the Minister of Economic Development and Technology in the 12th, 13th and 14th Government of Slovenia. He was also the president of Modern Centre Party from 2019 to 2021 and is the current president of liberal Concretely party.

References 

Living people
1957 births
Place of birth missing (living people)
Deputy Prime Ministers of Slovenia
Government ministers of Slovenia
21st-century Slovenian politicians
Ministers of Economic Development and Technology of Slovenia
Modern Centre Party politicians